Jeff Barber (born January 12, 1958) is an American college athletics administrator, currently serving as athletic director at Charleston Southern University. He previously served as athletic director at Liberty University from 2006 to 2016. During his tenure at Liberty, Barber oversaw extensive growth in the Flames athletic program, including the building of new venues for the school's baseball and softball programs. Barber also made the decision to eliminate Liberty's wrestling program in 2011, in order to bring the school in compliance with federal Title IX regulations. However, after several years of attempts, Barber was unable to secure Liberty an invitation to move up to a Football Bowl Subdivision conference, after several years of school president Jerry Falwell Jr. publicly stating Liberty's wish to reclassify. Barber resigned from his position at Liberty on November 17, 2016. Prior to his time at Liberty, Barber had previously served as an assistant athletic director at East Carolina University from 1987 to 1991; an associate athletic director at Furman University from 1991 to 1996; and an associate athletic director at the University of South Carolina from 1996 to 2006. Barber graduated from East Carolina University with a bachelor's degree in 1981. Barber was named athletic director at Charleston Southern University on May 17, 2018.

References

External links
Charleston Southern bio

1958 births
Living people
Charleston Southern Buccaneers athletic directors
Liberty Flames and Lady Flames athletic directors
East Carolina University alumni
Montreal Expos executives
Sportspeople from Greenville, North Carolina